Tom Reaney (11 August 1909 – 4 December 1994) was a New Zealand cricketer. He played in seven first-class matches for Wellington and Central Districts from 1927 to 1951.

References

External links
 

1909 births
1994 deaths
New Zealand cricketers
Wellington cricketers
Central Districts cricketers
Cricketers from Napier, New Zealand